Lion of Babylon is the name of a project undertaken by the Iraqi military in the late 1980s, under which Ba'athist Iraq attempted to locally produce the T-72, a Soviet-made main battle tank. The tanks were to be assembled at a factory near Taji in the Baghdad Governorate. 

The Lion of Babylon project of Saddam Hussein's regime was triggered in part by the American embargo against the sale of military vehicles to Iraq during the Iran–Iraq War. However, it is disputed how many tanks outlined in the project were finished, and likewise whether the Iraqi tanks reported to be "Lions of Babylon" during the Gulf War and Iraq War were merely imported T-72s.

The project draws its name from the Lion of Babylon, an ancient Babylonian symbol that was based on the Asiatic lion and represented the king of Babylon as well as the goddess Ishtar. The name is sometimes incorrectly used to refer to T-72s in Iraqi service, which were imported from the Soviet Union and Poland.

Production history
In 1986 a West German company built a factory in Taji to manufacture steel for several military uses. It was enlisted to retrofit and rebuild tanks already on duty in the Iraqi Army, such as T-54/55s, T-62s, and several hundred of Soviet and Polish T-72s, imported during early stages of the war with Iran.
In the late-1980s plans were made to produce new T-72M1 tanks in Taji. These tanks were to be assembled from knockdown kits delivered by the Polish state-owned company Bumar-Łabędy. The assembly was to start in 1989 and the tanks would receive the name Asad Babil (Lion of Babylon). According to Polish officials not a single T-72M1 was finished, even though in 1988 a T-72M was displayed on an Iraqi arms show, which was claimed to be locally produced. The local assembly of the T-72 started in Taji in early 1989 as suggested by Iraqi officials. A number of Iraqi officials such as Lt. General Amer Rashid however did not like the idea of being dependent on knockdown kits supplied by another country and pushed for the complete production of the T-72M1 tank instead.
In 1991 the Taji plant was destroyed by an airstrike while being upgraded by Bumar-Łabędy.

The United Nations imposed an arms embargo following the Iraqi invasion of Kuwait in August 1990, which reduced the complete assembly of tanks to simple spare parts for Lions and other tanks in the Iraqi arsenal. It is not known how many Lion tanks were completed during the span between early 1989 and this embargo.

Specifications
In most aspects, the Lion of Babylon is physically identical to the T-72M1 it is based on. Lion of Babylon T-72s were upgraded with the addition of laminated armor on the front slope and rear panels as protection against HEAT projectiles.
American military intelligence believed some were equipped with Belgian-made thermal sights. These same sources claim the tank was also provided with a better track protection against sand and mud than the Soviet T-72, by reducing the original number of shock absorbers. Some tanks also were fitted with a type of electro-optical interference pod of Chinese origin.
As secondary armament, the tank mounted either the NSV or the DShK 12.7 mm machine gun and the coaxial 7.62 mm PKT common to all T-72 models.

Armor

The Lion's primary armor was the same as the T-72M1, without any improvements. The Lion's side armor had 60 mm protection, the turret side armor was 300 mm, and the flat rear was 45 mm thick.

Despite the relative thinness, a retrofitted reinforced armor plate present both at the turret and the front upper hull seems to have been relatively effective against some shaped-charge ordnance, like the TOWs and Hellfire missiles. There are reports of Iraqi T-72s surviving near-misses from these weapons, although the reinforced armor generally did not prevent a mobility kill. However, it is also possible that the unexpected survival rate was due to the electro-optical countermeasures mounted on most of the tanks rather than the added armor. Some Lion tanks may have featured explosive reactive armor, possibly obtained from Polish T-72M1 spare parts.

Another improvised armor upgrade may have also been added at the Taji complex. An additional 30 mm armor plate was welded on the front areas of the hull and turret, leaving an air gap matching the size of the armor, so that the power of a HEAT jet could be dissipated in the hollow space. This technique follows the principle of spaced armor. The Iraqi engineers tested this reinforcement against captured Iranian 120 mm Chieftain tank guns in 1989, apparently with some success.

Combat history

Performance
The Lion of Babylon saw service in the 1991 Persian Gulf War as well as the 2003 invasion of Iraq. Like other tanks in the Iraqi inventory, Lions were mainly employed as armored self-propelled artillery, rather than in maneuver warfare roles. In operations, it fared poorly against American main battle tanks and armored fighting vehicles. For example, a 120 mm depleted uranium (DU) APFSDS round from an M1 Abrams could knock out a Lion of Babylon tank well beyond 3,000 m,  while the effective range of the tungsten-core 125 mm shell used by Iraq was 1,800 m.

Within closer ranges, the Lion of Babylon was more effective, especially while within prepared positions. However, even in such conditions, the T-72 did not fare well against M1s—as proven in the Battle of Norfolk during Desert Storm, although the tank also participated in the Battle of Phase Line Bullet, where Bradley IFVs from the 4th squadron of the 7th Cavalry Regiment were driven back by dug-in Iraqi armoured vehicles at heavy cost.

Persian Gulf War
The bulk of Iraqi armoured units were equipped with the Type 69 and only Republican Guard divisions were equipped with Iraqi-modified T-72s, with exception of the regular army's armored Saladin division. Thus, engagements between Lions of Babylon and American tanks were limited to conflicts involving such Iraqi units.

During Desert Storm, T-72s built in Taji were technologically 20 years out of date. Only one M1 Abrams was officially documented during the Persian Gulf War as having received enough damage to be towed and receive maintenance after being struck three times on the turret by a Lion. Another six M1A1s were allegedly hit by Iraqi T-72 tank fire in the Gulf War official report, but the impacts were largely ineffectual. According to Atkinson and Scales, Lions accounted for at least two M2 Bradley kills during Desert Storm and left several damaged, all on February 26, 1991.

2003 Iraq War

During the 2003 invasion of Iraq, the Republican Guard's Lions, most from the Medina Division, were deployed around Baghdad to attempt a last-ditch defense of the Baath regime.

In April 2003, U.S. tanks engaged their counterparts from just 50 yards, killing seven Iraqi T-72s without any losses. Such encounters exposed the poor marksmanship of Iraqi gunners, in part due to the shortage of modern night-vision and range-finder assets. The Lions were even more technologically lacking at this time, and it is not known if any improvements to the tanks were made between the Persian Gulf War and this conflict. Nonetheless, one Bradley was largely disabled by a 125 mm round from an Asad Babil tank when Iraqi armoured troops attempted to attack their American counterparts near Baghdad airport.

Fate
The last operational T-72s were destroyed by the successive waves of American armored incursions on the Iraqi capital or abandoned by their crews after the fall of Baghdad, several of them without firing a single shot. The derelict tanks were later scrapped by U.S. Army disposal teams or shipped to the United States for target practice.

Two years after the fall of Saddam Hussein, the new Iraqi Government acquired dozens of refitted T-72M1s from Hungary, in order to equip an armored brigade. The headquarters of this new Iraqi Army unit is located in Taji, so there may still remain some maintenance facilities from the production of Lions. Some surviving T-72s are used for training, and the experience of Iraqi Army officers and crews with the T-72 was one of the reasons behind the choice of Hungarian T-72M1s.

Notes

References

 Jane's Armor  & Artillery, Jane's Information Group, Surrey, 1988-89 Ed.
 Atkinson, Rick. Crusade, The untold story of the Persian Gulf War. Houghton Mifflin Company, 1993. 
 Bin, Alberto. Hill, Richard and Jones, Archer. Desert Storm, The Forgotten War. Greenwood Pub Group, 1998. 
 Bohannon, Second Lieutenant Richard M. "Dragon's Roar: 1-37 Armor in the Battle of 73 Easting." Armor, May–June 1992, VOL CI, #3.
 Conroy, Jason & Martz, Ron. Heavy Metal: A Tank Company's Battle To Baghdad Potomac Books, 2005. 
 Fahey, Dan. "Collateral Damage: How U.S. Troops Were Exposed To Depleted Uranium During the Persian Gulf War", in Metal of Dishonor: Depleted Uranium: How the Pentagon Radiates Soldiers and Civilians with DU Weapons, International Action Center, 1997. 
 Fontenot, Gregory, Degen, E. J. & Thon, David (2004). On Point: The United States Army in Operation Iraqi Freedom. Naval Institute Press. 
 Hinton, Henry L. & others: Operation Desert Storm: Bradley Fighting Vehicle, Abrams Tank, Apache Helicopter, Patriot Missile System and Foreign Government and Individual Contributions. DIANE Publishing, 2001. 
 Hofmann, George F. and Starry, Donn A. Editors. Camp Colt to Desert Storm : the history of U.S. armored forces, University Press of Kentucky, 1999. 
 Isby, David. Weapons and Tactics of the Soviet Army. Salamander Books, London, 1988. 
 Morris, David. Storm on the Horizon. Presidio Press, 2004. 
 Ricks, Thomas E. Fiasco: The American Military Adventure in Iraq. Penguin books, 2006. 
 Rostker, Bernard. Environmental Exposure Report:Depleted Uranium in the Gulf , DoD Publication, 1998. 
 Scales, Brigadier General Robert H. Jr. Certain Victory. Brassey's, 1994. 
 Scarborough, Rowan. Apache Operation a lesson in defeat The Washington Times, April 22, 2003.
 West, Francis J. Bing. No true glory. A frontline account of the battle for Fallujah. Bantam, 2005. 
 Zaloga Steven J., & Sarson, Peter. M1 Abrams Main Battle Tank 1982-1992. Osprey Military, New Vanguard. Reed International Books Ltd., 1993. 
 
 Zaloga Steven J., & Sarson, Peter. T-72 Main Battle Tank 1974-1993. Osprey Military, New Vanguard. Reed International Books Ltd., 1993. 
 Zucchino, David. Thunder Run: The armored strike to capture Baghdad. Grove Press, 2004.

Further reading

 The Death Lobby: How the West armed Iraq by Ken Timmerman
 Yazīd Ṣāyigh, Markaz Dirāsāt al-Waḥdah al-ʻArabīyah: Arab military industry: capability, performance, and impact. Brassey's, 1992. 

Post–Cold War main battle tanks
Main battle tanks of the Cold War
Main battle tanks of Iraq
Iraq–Soviet Union relations
T-72